Costa Constantinides (born January 7, 1975) is an American politician and attorney who served as a member of the New York City Council from the 22nd district. The district includes Astoria, East Elmhurst, part of Long Island City, Rikers Island and part of Woodside in Queens.

Early life and education

Constantinides was born and raised in Astoria, Queens. He attended local public schools P.S. 84 and P.S. 122, Constantinides graduated cum laude from Queens College with a bachelor's degree in political science and history. He then earned a Juris Doctor from the Benjamin Cardozo School of Law.

Career 
He was admitted to the New York State Bar Association in 2014.

Previously, Constantinides served as Deputy Chief of Staff to New York City Council Member James F. Gennaro of District 24. Constantinides is the first Greek-Cypriot American to hold elected office. Constantinides serves as the Chair of the Committee on Environmental Protection in the New York City Council.

In 2013 Councilman, Peter Vallone, Jr. was barred from seeking re-election due to term limits, Constantinides won the Democratic primary to succeed him, and easily won the general election later that year to take the seat.

Constantinides cannot seek re-election to the city council in 2020 due to term limits. After Melinda Katz was elected to serve as Queens County District Attorney, she was succeeded as Queens Borough President by Sharon Lee. Constantinides announced his candidacy for the special election to succeed Katz. Along with fellow council member Jimmy Van Bramer, Constantinides was defeated in the Democratic primary by Donovan Richards.

Costa resigned from the New York City Council on April 9, 2021, to head Variety Boys Girls Club.

References

External links
Costa Constantinides - New York City Council
Costa Constantinides (@Costa4NY)

Living people
People from Astoria, Queens
Queens College, City University of New York alumni
New York (state) Democrats
Benjamin N. Cardozo School of Law alumni
New York City Council members
1975 births
21st-century American politicians
American people of Greek Cypriot descent